Gopala Gopala is a 1996 Indian Tamil-language comedy drama film written and directed by Pandiarajan. The film stars himself and Khushbu, with music composed by Deva. The film ran for 100 days. The film was remade in Malayalam as Mister Butler and in Telugu as Suprabhatam.

Plot

Gopalakrishnan, a clever cook from Coimbatore, moves to an apartment in Chennai. He becomes quickly popular and appreciated among the apartment's women, however, their husbands get jealous of Gopalakrishnan. Meanwhile, he falls in love with Usha. He decides to marry her with the support of his neighbours. After the marriage, Usha has just learned that Gopalakrishnan was already married. Gopalakrishnan had got married with a girl but she was already pregnant and she eloped with her lover that very evening. Gopalakrishnan informed Usha's father of all these details, but Usha's father did not convey it to Usha because he thought it to be irrelevant. Usha, unaware of these details, is upset thinking that Gopalakrishnan tried to cheat her, and refuses to live with him. Usha's grandmother fuels Usha's mistrust towards Gopalakrishnan because the grandmother does not like Gopalakrishnan generally. Later, Gopalakrishnan finds a forsaken baby (by his ex-wife) in a dustbin and leaves the baby to an orphanage. Gopalakrishnan's father, an army officer, comes to live with his son and tries to help his son to win back Usha's heart. After a series of misunderstandings, Usha finally realises the honesty and good-naturedness of Gopalakrishnan and they reunite.

Cast

Pandiarajan as Gopalakrishnan and Usha's grandfather
Khushbu as Usha
Manivannan as Gopalakrishnan's father
Janagaraj as Kuzhanthaivel
Chithra as Meenakshi, Kuzhanthaivel's wife
Vennira Aadai Moorthy as Sundaram
Jyothi Meena as Annakili, Sundaram's wife
Charle as Chettiar
Kovai Sarala as Valliammai, Chettiar's wife
Malaysia Vasudevan as Usha's father
Jayanthi as Usha's mother
Sindhu
Anju as Fathima
Loose Mohan
Kollangudi Karuppayee as Usha's grandmother
Paandu as Chinna
Sempuli Jegan
Kumarimuthu
Jaguar Thangam as Gold
Pandiyan (guest appearance)

Soundtrack
The soundtrack was composed by Deva, with lyrics written by Vairamuthu.

References

External links 
 

1990s Tamil-language films
1996 comedy-drama films
1996 films
Films scored by Deva (composer)
Indian comedy-drama films
Tamil films remade in other languages